The 1878 Kansas gubernatorial election was held on November 5, 1878. Republican nominee John St. John defeated Democratic nominee John R. Goodin with 53.52% of the vote.

General election

Candidates
Major party candidates 
John St. John, Republican
John R. Goodin, Democratic

Other candidates
David P. Mitchell, Greenback

Results

References

1878
Kansas
Gubernatorial